(also written Eifuku-mon In) or  was a celebrated Japanese poet of the Kamakura period, and a consort of the 92nd emperor, Fushimi.

On 23 June 1316 (5th year of Shōwa), she took tonsure as a Buddhist nun and given the Dharma name Shin'nyo Gen (真如源).

References

1271 births
1342 deaths
Japanese empresses
13th-century Japanese poets
Japanese Buddhist nuns
13th-century Japanese women writers
14th-century Buddhist nuns
Nyoin
14th-century Japanese poets
Japanese women poets